Euthymol is a brand of antiseptic, fluoride-free toothpaste distributed by LG H&H UK that is characterised by its bright pink colour and medicinal taste. It is also notable for its packaging, which is old fashioned, having merely a pattern and the product name.

The supply of Euthymol toothpaste was temporarily interrupted in mid-2013 while the product was reformulated due to changes in the European Cosmetics Regulation. The new formulation of Euthymol was released to supply chains in January 2014 and was available in stores in February 2014.

The name Euthymol is simply a contraction of eucalyptus and thymol, which were the active ingredients of the original formulation. This was marketed by Parke, Davis & Co. as far back as 1896, and as well as toothpaste it was sold as a variety of antiseptic powders and creams, which contained thymol, oil of wintergreen, menthol, eucalyptus oil, boric acid and indigo, though modern formulations only contain the first three of those ingredients (amongst other things).

See also

 List of toothpaste brands
 Index of oral health and dental articles

References

External links
 Johnson & Johnson - Corporate site
 

Brands of toothpaste